The 2012 Mountain West Conference men's basketball tournament was   played at the Thomas & Mack Center in Las Vegas, Nevada in March 2012. Sponsored by Conoco; it was the first tournament without BYU or Utah, but included newcomer Boise State.

Bracket 

Mountain West Conference men's basketball tournament
Tournament
Mountain West Conference men's basketball tournament
Mountain West Conference men's basketball tournament